Portrait of a Young Girl may refer to any of a large number of artworks, including:

 Portrait of a Young Girl (Christus), a painting by Petrus Christus
 Portrait of a Young Girl (Anderson), a painting by Sophie Gengembre Anderson
 Portrait of a Young Girl (Chase), a painting by William Merritt Chase
 Portrait of a Young Girl (Henner), a painting by Jean-Jacques Henner
 Portrait of a Young Girl (Kendrick), a painting by Emma Eleonora Kendrick